The Champagne Stakes is an Australian Turf Club Group 1 horse race for two-year-old Thoroughbreds at set weights run at Randwick Racecourse, Sydney, Australia over a distance of 1,600 metres during the Sydney Autumn Carnival. Prize money is A$500,000.

History

The inaugural running of the race was on the second day of the Australian Jockey Club Autumn Meet in 1861 as the fourth race on the six race card. The winner was Exeter trained by the famous trainer of the time Etienne de Mestre. 
The race became the premier AJC sprint race for two-year-olds for nearly 80 years. With the introduction of the richer Golden Slipper Stakes in 1957, the AJC decided on extending the distance of the race to 1 mile (1972) and as such creating a natural progression for elite two year old races that is now known as the Juvenile Triple Crown – Golden Slipper Stakes, Sires Produce Stakes (ATC) and Champagne Stakes.

Six two-year-olds have won the Triple Crown: 
Baguette (1970), Luskin Star (1977), Tierce (1991), Burst (1992), Dance Hero (2004), Pierro (2012)

1914 racebook

Records

The record time for the race when the distance was 6 furlongs was by Vain in 1969 when he won by 10 lengths in a time of 1:09.40. At the time Vain became the richest money earning two year old in Australia.

The record time for the current 1600 metres distance is 1:34.47 set by Seabrook in 2018.

Distance
 1861 - 5 furlongs (~1000m)
1862–1864 - 1 mile (~1600m)
1865–1866 - 7 furlongs (~1400m)
1867–1880 - 5 furlongs (~1000m)
 1881 - 6 furlongs (~1200m)
 1882 - 5 furlongs (~1000m)
1883–1971 - 6 furlongs (~1200m)
 1972 - 1 mile (~1600m)
1973 onwards - 1600 metres

Gallery of noted winners

Winners

 2022 - She's Extreme  
 2021 - Captivant  
 2020 - King's Legacy     
 2019 - Castelvecchio 
 2018 - Seabrook 
 2017 - The Mission 
 2016 - Prized Icon
 2015 - Pasadena Girl
 2014 - Go Indy Go
 2013 - Guelph
 2012 - Pierro
 2011 - Helmet
 2010 - Skilled
 2009 - Onemorenomore
 2008 - Samantha Miss
 2007 - Meurice
 2006 - Mentality
 2005 - Carry On Cutie
 2004 - Dance Hero
 2003 - Hasna
 2002 - Victory Vein
 2001 - Viscount
 2000 - Assertive Lad
 1999 - Quick Star
 1998 - Dracula
 1997 - Encounter
 1996 - Intergaze
 1995 - Isolda
 1994 - Euphoria
 1993 - March Hare
 1992 - Burst
 1991 - Tierce
 1990 - Triscay
 1989 - Select Prince
 1988 - Full And By
 1987 - Sky Chase
 1986 - Bounding Away
 1985 - True Version
 1984 - Red Anchor
 1983 - Lady Eclipse
 1982 - I Like Diamonds
 1981 - Rose Of Kingston
 1980 - Palaban
 1979 - Charity
 1978 - Parade
 1977 - Luskin Star
 1976 - Vivarchi
 1975 - Rosie Heir
 1974 - Zasu
 1973 - Just Topic
 1972 - Anjudy
 1971 - Andros
 1970 - Baguette
 1969 - Vain
 1968 - Rajah
 1967 - Giulia
 1966 - Storm Queen
 1965 - Eye Liner
 1964 - Farnworth
 1963 - Time And Tide
 1962 - Bogan Road
 1961 - Columbia Star
 1960 - Sky High
 1959 - Noholme
 1958 - Wiggle
 1957 - Todman
 1956 - Count Olin
 1955 - Knave
 1954 - Lindbergh
 1953 - Prince Cortauld
 1952 - French Echo
 1951 - Ocean Bound
 1950 - True Course
 1949 - Lady Pirouette
 1948 - Wattle
 1947 - Temeraire
 1946 - Persian Prince
 1945 - Magnificent
 1944 - Scaur Fel
 1943 - Flight
 1942 - Bangster
 1941 - All Love
 1940 - John
 1939 - High Caste
 1938 - Pandava
 1937 - Ajax
 1936 - Tonga
 1935 - Young Idea
 1934 - Great Legend
 1933 - Hall Mark 
 1932 - Kuvera
 1931 - Burwood
 1930 - Chemosh
 1929 - Parkwood
 1928 - Mollison
 1927 - Cannon
 1926 - Rampion
 1925 - Manfred
 1924 - Heroic
 1923 - Linaway
 1922 - Rosina
 1921 - Furious
 1920 - Tressady Queen
 1919 - Bigaroon
 1918 - Outlook
 1917 - Thrice
 1916 - Wolaroi
 1915 - Two
 1914 - Woorak
 1913 - Athenic
 1912 - Cider
 1911 - Posadas
 1910 - Desert Rose
 1909 - Malt King
 1908 - Malt Queen
 1907 - Lady Rylstone
 1906 - Collarit
 1905 - Charles Stuart
 1904 - Lord Fitzroy
 1903 - Kilfera
 1902 - Brakpan
 1901 - Ibex
 1900 - Haulette
 1899 - Reviver
 1898 - Bobadil
 1897 - Aurum
 1896 - Coil
 1895 - Bob Ray
 1894 - Acmena
 1893 - Carnage
 1892 - Autonomy
 1891 - Oxide
 1890 - Wilga
 1889 - Rudolph
 1888 - Volley
 1887 - Matador
 1886 - Blairgowrie
 1885 - Uralla
 1884 - Bargo
 1883 - Warwick
 1882 - Navigator
 1881 - Spinningdale
 1880 - Grand Prix
 1879 - Baronet
 1878 - His Lordship
 1877 - Chester
 1876 - Robinson Crusoe
 1875 - Hyperion
 1874 - Kingsborough
 1873 - Rose D'Amour
 1872 - Lecturer
 1871 - Hamlet
 1870 - Florence
 1869 - Lamplighter
 1868 - Fenella
 1867 - Fireworks
 1866 - Fishhook
 1865 - The Pitsford
 1864 - Yattendon
 1863 - Mavourneen
 1862 - The Jade
 1861 - Exeter

See also
 List of Australian Group races
 Group races

References

External links 
First three placegetters Champagne Stakes (ATC)

Flat horse races for two-year-olds
Randwick Racecourse
Group 1 stakes races in Australia